The 2013–14 Binghamton Bearcats men's basketball team  represented Binghamton University during the 2013–14 NCAA Division I men's basketball season. The Bearcats, led by second year head coach Tommy Dempsey, played their home games at the Binghamton University Events Center and were members of the America East Conference. They finished the season 7–23, 4–12 in American East play to finish in a three way tie for seventh place. They lost in the quarterfinals of the American East tournament to Hartford.

Roster

Schedule

|-
!colspan=9 style="background:#006B54; color:#FFFFFF;"| Exhibition

|-
!colspan=9 style="background:#006B54; color:#FFFFFF;"| Regular season

|-
!colspan=9 style="background:#006B54; color:#FFFFFF;"| 2014 America East tournament

References

Binghamton Bearcats men's basketball seasons
Binghamton
Bingham Bear
Bingham Bear